Oliviero is a given name and a surname. Notable people with the name include:

Persons with the given name
Oliviero Beha (1949–2017), Italian journalist, writer, essayist, TV and radio host
Oliviero Carafa (1430–1511), Italian cardinal and diplomat of the Renaissance
Oliviero Diliberto (born 1956), Italian politician
Oliviero De Fabritiis (1902–1982), Italian conductor and composer
Oliviero Forzetta (1335–1373), notary and physician of Treviso from a family of self-confessed usurers
Oliviero Garlini (born 1957), retired Italian professional football player
Oliviero Gatti (1579–1648), an Italian painter and engraver, native of Parma
Oliviero Mascheroni (1914–1987), Italian professional football player
Angelo Oliviero Olivetti (1874–1931), Italian lawyer, journalist, and political activist
Oliviero Toscani (born 1942), Italian photographer, worked for Benetton from 1982 to 2000
Oliviero Troia (born 1994), Italian cyclist
Oliviero Vojak (1911–1932), professional football player in Italy
Oliviero Zega (1924–2012), retired Italian professional football player

Persons with the surname
Antonio Oliviero (born 1943), sailor from Italy
Giuliano Oliviero (born 1974), former Canadian soccer midfielder, head coach of the Milwaukee Wave
Leonardo Oliviero (1689–1752), Italian painter of the late-Baroque
Nino Oliviero (1918–1980), Italian composer

See also
Oliver (disambiguation)
Olivier (disambiguation)
Olivio (disambiguation)

Italian masculine given names